The women's 200 metre backstroke event at the 1972 Olympic Games took place September 4. This swimming event used backstroke.  Because an Olympic-size swimming pool is 50 metres long, this race consisted of four lengths of the pool.

Medalists

Results

Heats
Heat 1

Heat 2

Heat 3

Heat 4

Heat 5

Final

Key: WR = World record

References

Women's backstroke 200 metre
1972 in women's swimming
Women's events at the 1972 Summer Olympics